The 1984 European Parliament election was the second European election to be held in the United Kingdom. It was held on 14 June. The electoral system was First Past the Post in England, Scotland and Wales and Single transferable vote in Northern Ireland. The turnout was again the lowest in Europe. In England, Scotland and Wales, the Liberal Party and Social Democratic Party were in alliance, collecting 2,591,635 votes but not a single seat.

The election represented a small recovery for Labour, under Michael Foot's replacement Neil Kinnock, taking 15 seats from the Conservatives. In the general election of 1983, they had only had a vote share of 2% more than the SDP–Liberal Alliance (although they had nearly 10 times more MP's elected) and 15% less than the Conservatives.

Results

United Kingdom

Source: UK Parliament briefing

Overall (England, Scotland, Wales and Northern Ireland) turnout: 32.6% (EC average: 61%)
Overall votes cast: 13,998,190

Great Britain

Source: UK Parliament briefing

Total votes cast – 13,312,898.  All parties listed.

Northern Ireland

Source: Northern Ireland Social and Political Archive

 Constituency results Source: ''

See also
Elections in the United Kingdom: European elections
List of members of the European Parliament for the United Kingdom (1984–1989)

References 

1984
European Parliament
United Kingdom